The Developer Certificate of Origin (DCO) is a statement that a software developer agrees to, saying that "the contributor is allowed to make the contribution and that the project has the right to distribute it under its license."  It was introduced in 2004 by the Linux Foundation, to enhance the submission process for software used in the Linux kernel, shortly after the SCO–Linux disputes.

DCOs are often used as an alternative to a Contributor License Agreement (CLA). Instead of a signed legal contract, a DCO is an affirmation that the source code being submitted originated from the developer, or that the developer has permission to submit the code. Proponents of the DCO contend that it reduces the barriers of entry introduced by a CLA.

<nowiki>
Developer Certificate of Origin
Version 1.1

Copyright (C) 2004, 2006 The Linux Foundation and its contributors.
1 Letterman Drive
Suite D4700
San Francisco, CA, 94129

Everyone is permitted to copy and distribute verbatim copies of this
license document, but changing it is not allowed.

Developer's Certificate of Origin 1.1

By making a contribution to this project, I certify that:

(a) The contribution was created in whole or in part by me and I
    have the right to submit it under the open source license
    indicated in the file; or

(b) The contribution is based upon previous work that, to the best
    of my knowledge, is covered under an appropriate open source
    license and I have the right under that license to submit that
    work with modifications, whether created in whole or in part
    by me, under the same open source license (unless I am
    permitted to submit under a different license), as indicated
    in the file; or

(c) The contribution was provided directly to me by some other
    person who certified (a), (b) or (c) and I have not modified
    it.

(d) I understand and agree that this project and the contribution
    are public and that a record of the contribution (including all
    personal information I submit with it, including my sign-off) is
    maintained indefinitely and may be redistributed consistent with
    this project or the open source license(s) involved.
</nowiki>

References

External links
 Developer Certificate of Origin website, with Legal Text

Linux